Charles Wiley Doherty (January 5, 1857 – December 11, 1934) was a Democratic member of the Mississippi House of Representatives, representing Tunica County, from 1904 to 1912.

Biography 
Charles Wiley Doherty was born on January 5, 1857, in Jackson, Mississippi. His parents were Paul Manson Doherty and Mary (O'Sullivan) Doherty. He was of Irish descent. He was a telegraph operator and cotton planter by profession. He was elected to the Mississippi House of Representatives to represent Tunica County as a Democrat in 1903. He was re-elected in 1907. Afterwards, he became a consul at Cartagena, Colombia, and at Mexicali, Mexico. He died on December 11, 1934, in Phoenix, Arizona.

Personal life 
He was a Catholic. He married Meta White in 1883. They had two children: Annette Longstreet Doherty and Clark White Doherty.

References 

1857 births
1934 deaths
Politicians from Jackson, Mississippi
People from Tunica, Mississippi
Democratic Party members of the Mississippi House of Representatives
American people of Irish descent
American consuls